Crow Lake is an unincorporated community in Jerauld County, South Dakota, United States. It lies at an elevation of 1,729 ft (527 m).

References

Unincorporated communities in South Dakota
Unincorporated communities in Jerauld County, South Dakota